Arawacus sito, the fine-lined stripe-streak, is a butterfly of the family Lycaenidae. It is in found from Mexico, south to Central America, including Guatemala, Honduras, Nicaragua and Panama

External links
Butterflies of America

Arawacus
Butterflies described in 1836